Milan Kajkl (May 14, 1950 – January 18, 2014) was a Czechoslovak Olympic ice hockey player.

Kajkl was born in Plzeň, Czechoslovakia.  He participated at the 1976 Winter Olympics in Innsbruck, where his team won a silver medal.

Kajkl died January 18, 2014, in Plzen at the age of 63.

References

External links
 
 
 
 
 

1950 births
2014 deaths
Czech ice hockey defencemen
Czechoslovak ice hockey defencemen
Ice hockey players at the 1976 Winter Olympics
Olympic ice hockey players of Czechoslovakia
Olympic medalists in ice hockey
Olympic silver medalists for Czechoslovakia
Sportspeople from Plzeň
HC Plzeň players
HC Dukla Jihlava players
EV Zug players
EC KAC players
Czechoslovak expatriate sportspeople in Switzerland
Czechoslovak expatriate sportspeople in Austria
Expatriate ice hockey players in Switzerland
Expatriate ice hockey players in Austria
Czechoslovak expatriate ice hockey people